Shap is a linear village and civil parish located among fells and isolated dales in Eden district, Cumbria, England, in the historic county of Westmorland. The parish had a population of 1,221 in 2001, increasing slightly to 1,264 at the 2011 Census.

Location
The village lies along the A6 road and the West Coast Main Line, and is near to the M6 motorway.

Shap is on the route of the Coast to Coast Walk.

Etymology
Early (12th and 13th century) forms such as Hep and Yheppe point to an Old Norse rendering Hjáp of an Old English original Hēap = "heap", (of stones), probably referring to an ancient stone circle, cairn, or to the Shap Stone Avenue just to the west of the village.

History
Although Shap is geographically a small village, it is legally a market town with a charter dating from the 17th century. The parish was, between 1905 and 1935, administered by an urban district council. At one time, the granite works (which are situated about a mile outside the village) was in itself a separate community, with its own Co-op store.  Shap polished pink granite can be found in many buildings in the UK, including outside St Paul's Cathedral in London.

Shap today

The village has three pubs, a small supermarket, a fish and chip shop, an antique book shop, a butcher's shop, a primary school, a newsagent's, a coffee shop, a ceramic art studio called Edge Ceramics, a fire station, a shoe shop (New Balance factory shop) an Anglican church and 3 B&B/ Hostels.  There is also a small library, which is in the process of being relinquished from local council control and being adopted by the community as part of a budget cutting measure.

Major employers in the area are Hanson and Tata Steel.

Some of the scenes in the feature film Withnail and I were filmed around Shap. Sleddale Hall, the filming location for Uncle Monty's cottage Crow Crag, is located near Wet Sleddale Reservoir.

On 22 October 1999, a Hawk jet from RAF Leeming crashed into an empty barn in the village before disintegrating across the A6 and West Coast railway line, killing its two-man crew.

Attractions

Shap Fell used to be notorious for the difficult and dangerous stretch of A6 for drivers, and it includes a well-known section of the West Coast Main Line.  It has a 1:75 gradient for trains heading north, and in the days of steam locomotives banking engines from Tebay were often used to assist trains. It has been popular with railway photographers and there have been many pictures published taken in the area, most notably at Scout Green which lies on the southern approach to the hill.

Shap Fell  is known for Shap granite, a pink rock rich in orthoclase, quartz and biotite; Shap Pink Quarry  takes its name from this.

Shap Abbey  is nearby in the secluded valley of the river Lowther. Now impressive ruins dating from 1199, the Abbey was one of the last abbeys to be dissolved by Henry VIII in 1540.

Shap Wells has a mineral spa located in the grounds of the Shap Wells hotel which was used in World War II as a prisoner of war camp.

In literature

A scene in Robert Neill's historical novel Crown and Mitre is laid in Shap. In 1659 the book's protagonist Hal Burnaby, a young Royalist, rides through the village on a clandestine mission connected with the restoration of King Charles II.
Shap also appears in Anthony Trollope's novel Can You Forgive Her? as the nearest village to Vavasor Hall, the ancestral home of the heroine Alice Vavasor.

Governance
The civil parish of Shap (formerly Shap Urban Parish) includes the hamlet of Keld and parts of the granite works and limestone works, and has a population of 1,221, increasing to 1,264 at the 2011 Census.  The parish shares a joint parish council and an electoral ward with Shap Rural. The total population of the electoral ward taken at the 2011 census was 1,394.

Shap is in the parliamentary constituency of Penrith and the Border. Neil Hudson was elected its Conservative Member of Parliament at the 2019 General Election, replacing Rory Stewart.

Prior to Brexit, for the European Parliament its residents voted to elect MEP's for the North West England constituency.

For Local Government purposes it is in the Shap Ward of Eden District Council and the Eden Lakes Division of Cumbria County Council.

Transport
The Lancaster and Carlisle Railway (now part of the West Coast Main Line), opened on 17 December 1846, and runs along the eastern edge of the village. Shap railway station was closed in 1968, though there have been calls for its re-opening. Penrith is the closest railway station and is situated on the West Coast Main Line.

Dialect 
The people of Shap speak a variant of the Penrithian dialect, which is itself a variant of the Cumbrian dialect spoken around the Penrith and Eden district area.

See also

Listed buildings in Shap

References

External links 

  Cumbria County History Trust: Shap (nb: provisional research only – see Talk page)
 Shap Community Website – Maintained by the Parish Council
 Shap Air Crash Anniversary
 Rail Worker's Monument, Shap
 Video footage and history of Keld Chapel
 Video footage of the Shap Wells Spa and Hotel

 
Villages in Cumbria
Westmorland
Civil parishes in Cumbria
Eden District